Talorcan son of Uurguist (Scottish Gaelic: Talorgen  mac Óengusa) was a king of the Picts. The Annals of Ulster report the death of Dub Tholargg (Black Talorcen) king of the Picts on this side of the Mounth in 782. He is presumed to have been the son of Óengus mac Fergusa. He was succeeded by his son Drest.

See also
 House of Óengus

References

External links
Annals of Ulster, part 1, at CELT
The Pictish Chronicle

782 deaths
Pictish monarchs
Medieval Gaels
8th-century monarchs in Europe
8th-century Scottish people